Bruno Carvalho may refer to:

 Bruno Carvalho (footballer, born 1974), Brazilian football player, full name Bruno Segadas Vianna Carvalho
 Bruno Carvalho (footballer, born 1986), Portuguese football player, full name Bruno Alexandre Silva Carvalho